Jeon Kwang-Hwan  (born July 29, 1982) is a South Korean footballer. He last played for Bucheon FC 1995.

References

1982 births
Living people
South Korean footballers
Jeonbuk Hyundai Motors players
Gimcheon Sangmu FC players
Bucheon FC 1995 players
K League 1 players
K League 2 players
Association football midfielders